Tollywood films of 1961 may refer to:
Bengali films of the 1961
Telugu films of 1961